Thailand first participated at the International Science Olympiad (ISO)—a group of academic competitions for secondary school students—in 1989, when it sent representatives to compete in the International Mathematical Olympiad in Germany. Since then, it has expanded to send representatives to every branch of the annual competition.

Selection as the country's representatives for the ISO is highly competitive, and involves multiple steps of examinations and academic training camps organised by the Institute for the Promotion of Teaching Science and Technology (IPST) and the Promotion of Academic Olympiads and Development of Science Education Foundation (POSN). Country representatives are awarded international scholarships for undergraduate and graduate studies in their fields.

In addition to the International Mathematical Olympiad, Thailand first sent representatives to the International Physics Olympiad and International Chemistry Olympiad in 1990, the International Olympiad in Informatics and International Biology Olympiad in 1991, the International Astronomy Olympiad and International Junior Science Olympiad, and the International Geography Olympiad in 2015. Thailand will first send representatives to the International Philosophy Olympiad in 2018.

Hosted Olympiad

Medal tables

International Mathematical Olympiad (IMO)

International Physics Olympiad (IPhO)

International Chemistry Olympiad (IChO)

International Olympiad in Informatics (IOI)

International Biology Olympiad (IBO) 

*IBO 2020 Special Award: The 3D Reconstruction Award (Practical 1: Animal Physiology)

International Philosophy Olympiad (IPO)

International Astronomy Olympiad (IAO)

International Geography Olympiad (IGeO)

International Linguistics Olympiad (IOL)

International Junior Science Olympiad (IJSO)

International Olympiad on Astronomy and Astrophysics (IOAA)

International Earth Science Olympiad (IESO)

See also 
 Thailand at the Olympics
 Thailand at the Youth Olympics
 Thailand at the Paralympics

References

External links
 
 
 

International Science Olympiad
Science education in Thailand